Federman is a surname of German origin, originating as an occupational surname for someone who traded feathers or quill pens. Notable people with the surname include:

Daniel Federman (1928-2017), American endocrinologist and professor
Irwin Federman (born 1936), American businessman and philanthropist
Noam Federman (born 1969), Israeli activist
Raymond Federman (1928-2009), French-American novelist and academic
Wayne Federman (born 1959), American comedian, actor, author, writer, comedy historian, producer, and musician

See also
Federman, Michigan, a former unincorporated community
Federmann